Events from the year 1892 in Canada.

Incumbents

Crown 
 Monarch – Victoria

Federal government 
 Governor General – Frederick Stanley 
 Prime Minister – John Abbott (until November 24) then John Thompson (from December 5)
 Chief Justice – William Johnstone Ritchie (New Brunswick) (until 25 September) then Samuel Henry Strong (Ontario) (from 13 December)
 Parliament – 7th

Provincial governments

Lieutenant governors 
Lieutenant Governor of British Columbia – Hugh Nelson (until November 1) then Edgar Dewdney 
Lieutenant Governor of Manitoba – John Christian Schultz 
Lieutenant Governor of New Brunswick – Samuel Leonard Tilley  
Lieutenant Governor of Nova Scotia – Malachy Bowes Daly   
Lieutenant Governor of Ontario – Alexander Campbell (until May 24) then George Airey Kirkpatrick (from May 30) 
Lieutenant Governor of Prince Edward Island – Jedediah Slason Carvell 
Lieutenant Governor of Quebec – Auguste-Réal Angers (until December 5) then Joseph-Adolphe Chapleau

Premiers    
Premier of British Columbia – John Robson (until June 29) then Theodore Davie (from July 2)
Premier of Manitoba – Thomas Greenway 
Premier of New Brunswick – Andrew George Blair  
Premier of Nova Scotia – William Stevens Fielding  
Premier of Ontario – Oliver Mowat    
Premier of Prince Edward Island – Frederick Peters 
Premier of Quebec – Charles Boucher de Boucherville (until December 16)then Louis-Olivier Taillon

Territorial governments

Lieutenant governors 
 Lieutenant Governor of Keewatin – John Christian Schultz
 Lieutenant Governor of the North-West Territories – Joseph Royal

Premiers 
 Chairman of the Executive Committee of the North-West Territories – Frederick Haultain

Events
June 29 – John Robson, Premier of British Columbia, dies in office
July 2 – Theodore Davie becomes Premier of British Columbia
July 8 – The Great Fire of 1892 destroys two-thirds of St. John's, Newfoundland
July 9 – Parliament passes the Criminal Code, 1892, the first unified criminal law for all of Canada, under the direction of the Minister of Justice, John Thompson
November 24 – Sir John Abbott resigns as Prime Minister
December 5 – Sir John Thompson becomes Prime Minister
December 16 – Sir Louis-Olivier Taillon becomes premier of Quebec for the second time, replacing Sir Charles-Eugène de Boucherville

Full date unknown
 The Toronto Star founded
 Harbord Collegiate Institute was opened
 Humberside Collegiate Institute opened
 Worthington, Ontario, is incorporated as a mining community.
 The first Canadian National Rugby-Football Championship game is played (Osgoode Hall defeats Montreal 45–5).

Sport
First documented women's ice hockey game takes place in Barrie, Ontario playing on an outdoor ice surface.

Births

January to June
March 4 – J.-Eugène Bissonnette, politician and physician
April 8 – Mary Pickford, actress and studio co-founder (d.1979)
May 3 – Jacob Viner, economist (d.1970)
May 18 – John Croak, VC
June 2 – Edward LeRoy Bowerman, politician (d.1977)

July to December
July 14 – John Sissons, barrister, author, judge and politician (d.1969)
August 2 – Jack L. Warner, studio mogul (d.1978)
August 18 – Hal Foster, cartoonist (d.1982)
September 21 – Donald Elmer Black, politician
September 24 – Adélard Godbout, politician and 15th Premier of Quebec (d.1956)
October 25 – Nell Shipman, actress, screenwriter, producer and animal trainer (d.1970)
November 20 – Bert Collip, biochemist
December 20 – Percy Corbett, legal scholar

Deaths

January 1 – John Chipman Wade, politician and lawyer (b.1817)
January 20 – Samuel Barton Burdett, politician, lawyer and lecturer (b.1843)
March 7 – Andrew Rainsford Wetmore, Premier of New Brunswick (b. 1820)
April 6 – John Ostell, architect, surveyor and manufacturer (b.1813)
April 17 – Alexander Mackenzie, building contractor, newspaper editor, politician and 2nd Prime Minister of Canada (b.1822)
May 24 – Alexander Campbell, politician, Senator and 6th Lieutenant Governor of Ontario (b.1822)
June 9 – William Grant Stairs, explorer, soldier and adventurer (b.1863)
June 29 – John Robson, journalist, politician and Premier of British Columbia (b.1824)
July 15 – William Donahue, merchant and politician (b.1834)
August 30 – Frederick Newton Gisborne, Laid first under-sea cable in North America
September 12 – Marc-Amable Girard, politician, Senator and 2nd Premier of Manitoba (b.1822)
December 14 – Adams George Archibald, politician (b.1814)

Historical documents

 Newspaper coverage of Great Fire of St. John's, Newfoundland

 U.S. accuses Canadian Pacific Railway of helping Chinese illegally cross border from British Columbia

 Running Wolf and Owl Child's performance of Moon Dance described

 "Completely won the hearts of her audience" - Poet of Kanien'kéhà:ka origin, Pauline Johnson, gives first solo recital in Toronto

 English visitor rides out from Lethbridge, Alberta to watch 2000-head cattle roundup

References
  

 
Years of the 19th century in Canada
Canada
1892 in North America